Aghkand-e Samaraq (also Romanized as Āgh Kand-e S̄amaraq; also known as Āqkand-e S̄amaraq) is a village in Qareh Naz Rural District, in the Central District of Maragheh County, East Azerbaijan Province, Iran. At the 2006 census, its population was 333, in 80 families.

References 

Towns and villages in Maragheh County